Telluric Chaos is a live album by the reunited Iggy Pop & The Stooges. It chronicles the closing date of the band's first ever Japanese tour, which took place on March 22, 2004, at the Shibuya AX in Tokyo. The album documents a typical reunited Stooges set, primarily drawn from the band's first two albums (including all of Fun House) with no material from the James Williamson era (Raw Power, Kill City). This live set also includes some of the first live performances of three of the four Stooges reunion tracks from Iggy Pop's 2003 solo album Skull Ring plus one brand new song, "My Idea of Fun" (a finalized version appears on their 2007 studio album The Weirdness).

Track listing
All songs written by Iggy Pop, Ron Asheton, Dave Alexander and Scott Asheton except as noted.

 "Loose" – 3:56
 "Down on the Street" – 4:23
 "1969" – 3:40
 "I Wanna Be Your Dog" – 5:37
 "TV Eye" – 5:11
 "Dirt" – 3:52
 "Real Cool Time" – 3:08
 "No Fun" – 4:12
 "1970" (Pop, R. Asheton, Alexander, S. Asheton, Steve Mackay) – 6:14
 "Fun House / L.A. Blues" (Pop, R. Asheton, Alexander, S. Asheton, Mackay) – 7:19
 "Skull Ring" (Pop, R. Asheton, S. Asheton) – 5:07
 "Dead Rock Star" (Pop, R. Asheton, S. Asheton) – 4:18
 "Little Electric Chair" (Pop, R. Asheton, S. Asheton) – 5:16
 "Little Doll" – 5:07
 "My Idea of Fun" (Pop, R. Asheton, S. Asheton) – 5:04
 "I Wanna Be Your Dog" (version two)  – 3:50
 "Not Right" – 3:07

Personnel 
The Stooges (remaining 1969/1970 line-up):

Iggy Pop - vocals
Ron Asheton - electric guitar
Scott Asheton - drums

with
Mike Watt - bass guitar
Steve Mackay - saxophone

References

The Stooges albums
2005 live albums